Naked Obsession is a 1990 American film written and directed by Dan Golden and starring William Katt. It was produced by Roger Corman.

Production
The script was based on the real-life Preppy Murder.

References

External links

1990 films
1990 drama films
Films produced by Roger Corman
American crime thriller films
American films based on actual events
Films directed by Dan Golden
1990s American films